Vinylsilane refers to an organosilicon compound with chemical formula CH2=CHSiH3. It is a derivative of silane (SiH4).  The compound, which is a colorless gas, is mainly of theoretical interest.

Substituted vinylsilanes
More commonly used than the parent vinylsilane are vinyl-substituted silanes with other substituents on silicon.  In the area of organic synthesis, vinylsilanes are useful intermediates.

In the area of polymer chemistry and materials science, vinyltrimethoxysilane or vinyltriethoxysilane serve as monomers  and coupling agents.

Preparation
Vinylsilanes are often prepared by hydrosilylation of alkynes.  They can be made by the reaction of alkenyl lithium and Grignard reagents with chlorosilanes.  In some cases dehydrogenative silylation is another method.

References

Carbosilanes
Monomers
Vinyl compounds